Below is a list of people involved in coronations of the British monarch:

Clerics

Presiding clerics
1714: Thomas Tenison, Archbishop of Canterbury
1727: William Wake, Archbishop of Canterbury
1761: Thomas Secker, Archbishop of Canterbury
1821: Charles Manners-Sutton, Archbishop of Canterbury
1831: William Howley, Archbishop of Canterbury
1838: William Howley, Archbishop of Canterbury
1902: Frederick Temple, Archbishop of Canterbury
1911: Randall Davidson, Archbishop of Canterbury
1937: Cosmo Gordon Lang, Archbishop of Canterbury
1953: Geoffrey Fisher, Archbishop of Canterbury
2023: Justin Welby, Archbishop of Canterbury (expected)

Deans of Westminster
1714: Francis Atterbury, Bishop of Rochester
1727: Samuel Bradford, Bishop of Rochester
1761: Zachary Pearce, Bishop of Rochester
1821: John Ireland
1831: John Ireland
1838: Ireland was too ill to take part, and his place was taken by his Sub-Dean
1902: Armitage Robinson
1911: Herbert Edward Ryle
1937: William Foxley Norris
1953: Alan Campbell Don
2023: David Hoyle (expected)

Standard bearers

Australia
1911: Henry Northcote, 1st Baron Northcote
1937: Stanley Bruce
1953: Sir Thomas White
2023: TBA

Canada
1911: John Hamilton-Gordon, 7th Earl of Aberdeen
1937: Vincent Massey
1953: Norman Robertson
2023: TBA

Ceylon
1953: Sir Edwin Wijeyeratne

England
1821: Rowland Hill, 1st Baron Hill
1902: Frank Dymoke
1911: Frank Dymoke
1937: Edward Stanley, 17th Earl of Derby
1953: Edward Stanley, 18th Earl of Derby
2023: TBA

Hanover
1821: John Bourke, 4th Earl of Mayo

India
1911: George Curzon, 1st Baron Curzon of Kedleston
1937: Sir Firozkhan Noon

Ireland
1821: William Beresford, 1st Baron Beresford
1902: Charles O'Conor Don
1937: Bernard Forbes, 8th Earl of Granard
1953: William Sidney, 6th Baron De L'Isle and Dudley
2023: TBA

New Zealand
1911: William Plunket, 5th Baron Plunket
1937: W. J. Jordan
1953: Frederick Doidge
2023: TBA

Pakistan
1953: Mirza Abol Hassan Ispahani

Royal
1821: Charles Stanhope, 3rd Earl of Harrington
1911: Henry Petty-FitzMaurice, 5th Marquess of Lansdowne
1937: George Cholmondeley, 5th Marquess of Cholmondeley
1953: Bernard Montgomery, 1st Viscount Montgomery of Alamein
2023: TBA

Scotland
1821: James Maitland, 8th Earl of Lauderdale
1902: Henry Scrymgeour-Wedderburn, de jure 10th Earl of Dundee
1937: Henry Scrymgeour-Wedderburn, de jure 11th Earl of Dundee
1953: Henry Scrymgeour-Wedderburn, de facto 11th Earl of Dundee
2023: TBA

South Africa
1911: William Palmer, 2nd Earl of Selborne
1937: C. T. te Water
1953: Albertus Geyer

Union
1821: George Cholmondeley, 1st Marquess of Cholmondeley
1902: Arthur Wellesley, 4th Duke of Wellington
1911: Arthur Wellesley, 4th Duke of Wellington
1937: Frank Dymoke
1953: Capt. John Dymoke
2023: Francis John Fane Marmion Dymoke (expected)

Wales
1911: Llewelyn Lloyd-Mostyn, 3rd Baron Mostyn
1937: Ivor Windsor-Clive, 2nd Earl of Plymouth
1953: William Ormsby-Gore, 4th Baron Harlech
2023: TBA

Regalia

Sovereign's regalia

Bearers of St Edward's Crown (and Lord High Stewards of England)
1685: James Butler, 1st Duke of Ormonde
1702: William Cavendish, 1st Duke of Devonshire
1714: Charles FitzRoy, 2nd Duke of Grafton
1727: Lionel Sackville, 1st Duke of Dorset
1761: William Talbot, 1st Earl Talbot
1821: Henry Paget, 1st Marquess of Anglesey
1831: Alexander Hamilton, 10th Duke of Hamilton
1838: Alexander Hamilton, 10th Duke of Hamilton
1902: Charles Spencer-Churchill, 9th Duke of Marlborough
1911: Henry Percy, 7th Duke of Northumberland
1937: James Gascoyne-Cecil, 4th Marquess of Salisbury
1953: Andrew Cunningham, 1st Viscount Cunningham of Hyndhope
2023: TBA

Bearers of St Edward's Staff
1685: Robert Bruce, 1st Earl of Ailesbury
1702: Charles Sackville, 6th Earl of Dorset
1714: James Cecil, 5th Earl of Salisbury
1727: Henry Grey, 1st Duke of Kent
1761: Evelyn Pierrepont, 2nd Duke of Kingston-upon-Hull
1821: James Cecil, 1st Marquess of Salisbury
1831: George FitzRoy, 4th Duke of Grafton
1838: James Innes-Ker, 6th Duke of Roxburghe
1902: Charles Wynn-Carington, 1st Earl Carrington
1911: Henry Innes-Ker, 8th Duke of Roxburghe
1937: Edward Wood, 1st Viscount Halifax
1953: Gilbert Heathcote-Drummond-Willoughby, 3rd Earl of Ancaster
2023: TBA

Bearers of the Golden Spurs
1685: Henry Yelverton, 15th Baron Grey de Ruthyn
1702: Henry Yelverton, 1st Viscount Longueville
1714: Talbot Yelverton, 2nd Viscount Longueville
1727: William Montagu, 2nd Duke of Manchester (for Talbot Yelverton, 1st Earl of Sussex who was acting as Earl Marshal)
1761: Henry Yelverton, 3rd Earl of Sussex
1821: George Gough-Calthorpe, 3rd Baron Calthorpe
1831: George Rawdon-Hastings, 2nd Marquess of Hastings
1838: George Byron, 7th Baron Byron
1902: Rawdon Clifton, 23rd Baron Grey de Ruthyn and Charles Rawdon-Hastings, 11th Earl of Loudoun (one each)
1911: Rawdon Clifton, 23rd Baron Grey de Ruthyn and Charles Rawdon-Hastings, 11th Earl of Loudoun (one each)
1937: Richard Yarde-Buller, 4th Baron Churston and Albert Astley, 21st Baron Hastings (one each)
1953: Richard Yarde-Buller, 4th Baron Churston and Albert Astley, 21st Baron Hastings (one each)
2023: TBA

Bearers of the Sceptre with the Cross
1685: Henry Mordaunt, 2nd Earl of Peterborough
1702: George Hastings, 8th Earl of Huntingdon
1714: Lionel Sackville, 7th Earl of Dorset
1727: John Montagu, 2nd Duke of Montagu
1761: George Spencer, 4th Duke of Marlborough
1821: Richard Wellesley, 1st Marquess Wellesley
1831: William Beauclerk, 9th Duke of St Albans
1838: William Vane, 1st Duke of Cleveland
1902: John Campbell, 9th Duke of Argyll
1911: John Campbell, 9th Duke of Argyll
1937: Evelyn Seymour, 17th Duke of Somerset
2023: TBA

Bearers of the Sword of State
1685: Aubrey de Vere, 20th Earl of Oxford
1702: Aubrey de Vere, 20th Earl of Oxford
1714: James Stanley, 10th Earl of Derby
1727: Theophilus Hastings, 9th Earl of Huntingdon
1761: Francis Hastings, 10th Earl of Huntingdon
1821: Charles Sackville-Germain, 5th Duke of Dorset
1831: Charles Grey, 2nd Earl Grey
1838: William Lamb, 2nd Viscount Melbourne
1902: Charles Vane-Tempest-Stewart, 6th Marquess of Londonderry
1911: William Lygon, 7th Earl Beauchamp
1937: Lawrence Dundas, 2nd Marquess of Zetland
1953: Robert Gascoyne-Cecil, 5th Marquess of Salisbury
2023 TBA

Bearers of the Pointed Sword of Justice to the Spirituality (Second Sword)
1685: William Stanley, 9th Earl of Derby
1702: William Stanley, 9th Earl of Derby
1714: John Gordon, 16th Earl of Sutherland
1727: Henry Clinton, 7th Earl of Lincoln
1761: Henry Howard, 12th Earl of Suffolk
1821: Hugh Percy, 3rd Duke of Northumberland
1831: Arthur Hill, 3rd Marquess of Downshire
1838: George Sutherland-Leveson-Gower, 2nd Duke of Sutherland
1902: Frederick Roberts, 1st Earl Roberts
1911: Frederick Roberts, 1st Earl Roberts
1937: George Milne, 1st Baron Milne
1953: Alexander Douglas-Home, 14th Earl of Home
2023: TBA

Bearers of the Pointed Sword of Justice to the Temporality (Third Sword)
1685: Thomas Herbert, 8th Earl of Pembroke
1702: Thomas Herbert, 8th Earl of Pembroke
1714: Thomas Herbert, 8th Earl of Pembroke
1727: John Lindsay, 20th Earl of Crawford
1761: William Sutherland, 18th Earl of Sutherland
1821: George Stewart, 8th Earl of Galloway
1831: William Vane, 1st Marquess of Cleveland
1838: Robert Grosvenor, 1st Marquess of Westminster
1902: Garnet Wolseley, 1st Viscount Wolseley
1911: Herbert Kitchener, 1st Viscount Kitchener
1937: Hugh Trenchard, 1st Viscount Trenchard
1953: Walter Montagu Douglas Scott, 8th Duke of Buccleuch
2023: TBA

Bearers of the Sword of Mercy (Curtana)
1685: Charles Talbot, 12th Earl of Shrewsbury
1702: Anthony Grey, 11th Earl of Kent
1714: Henry Clinton, 7th Earl of Lincoln
1727: Thomas Herbert, 8th Earl of Pembroke
1761: Henry Pelham-Clinton, 9th Earl of Lincoln
1821: Henry Pelham-Clinton, 4th Duke of Newcastle-under-Lyne
1831: James Gascoyne-Cecil, 2nd Marquess of Salisbury
1838: William Cavendish, 6th Duke of Devonshire
1902: Augustus FitzRoy, 7th Duke of Grafton
1911: Henry Somerset, 9th Duke of Beaufort
1937: William Boyle, 12th Earl of Cork
1953: Hugh Percy, 10th Duke of Northumberland
2023: TBA

Bearers of the Jewelled Sword of Offering and the Ruby Rings
1831: Thomas Mash
1902: Sir Henry Gough
1911: Sir Hedworth Lambton
1937: Sir Lionel Halsey
1953: Alexander Hardinge, 2nd Baron Hardinge of Penshurst
2023: TBA

Bearers of the Sceptre with the Dove
1685: Christopher Monck, 2nd Duke of Albemarle
1702: Charles Lennox, 1st Duke of Richmond
1714: John Campbell, 2nd Duke of Argyll
1727: John Campbell, 2nd Duke of Argyll
1761: Charles Lennox, 3rd Duke of Richmond
1821: John Manners, 3rd Duke of Rutland
1831: Charles Gordon-Lennox, 5th Duke of Richmond
1838: Charles Gordon-Lennox, 5th Duke of Richmond
1902: Charles Bingham, 4th Earl of Lucan
1911: Charles Gordon-Lennox, 7th Duke of Richmond
1937: Frederick Gordon-Lennox, 9th Duke of Richmond
1953: Frederick Gordon-Lennox, 9th Duke of Richmond
2023: TBA

Bearers of the Orb
1685: Charles Seymour, 6th Duke of Somerset
1702: Charles Seymour, 6th Duke of Somerset
1714: Charles Seymour, 6th Duke of Somerset
1727: Charles Seymour, 6th Duke of Somerset
1761: Edward Seymour, 9th Duke of Somerset
1821: William Cavendish, 6th Duke of Devonshire
1831: Edward St Maur, 11th Duke of Somerset
1838: Edward St Maur, 11th Duke of Somerset
1902: Algernon Seymour, 15th Duke of Somerset
1911: Algernon Seymour, 15th Duke of Somerset
1937: George Sutherland-Leveson-Gower, 5th Duke of Sutherland
1953: Harold Alexander, 1st Earl Alexander of Tunis
2023: TBA

Consort's regalia

Bearers of the consort's crown
1685: Henry Somerset, 1st Duke of Beaufort
1714: None (Sophia of Celle was imprisoned)
1727: Charles Beauclerk, 2nd Duke of St Albans
1761: Charles Powlett, 5th Duke of Bolton
1821: None (Queen Caroline was not permitted to attend the coronation)
1831: Henry Somerset, 6th Duke of Beaufort
1838: None
1902: Henry Innes-Ker, 8th Duke of Roxburghe
1911: Victor Cavendish, 9th Duke of Devonshire
1937: William Cavendish-Bentinck, 6th Duke of Portland
1953: Not used for male consorts
2023: TBA

Bearers of the consort's Sceptre with the Cross
1685: John Manners, 9th Earl of Rutland
1714: None (Sophia of Celle was in imprisonment)
1727: John Manners, 3rd Duke of Rutland
1761: John Manners, 3rd Duke of Rutland
1821: None (Queen Caroline was not permitted to attend the coronation)
1831: George Child-Villiers, 5th Earl of Jersey
1838: None
1902: George Harris, 4th Baron Harris
1911: Henry Beresford, 6th Marquess of Waterford
1937: John Manners, 9th Duke of Rutland
1953: Not used for male consorts
2023: TBA

Bearers of the Ivory Rod with the Dove
1483: Edward Grey, 1st Viscount Lisle
1685: Charles Sackville, 6th Earl of Dorset
1714: None (Sophia of Celle was in imprisoned)
1727: James Compton, 5th Earl of Northampton
1761: Charles Compton, 7th Earl of Northampton
1821: None (Queen Caroline was not permitted to attend the coronation)
1831: John Campbell, 1st Earl Cawdor
1838: None
1902: Archibald Acheson, 4th Earl of Gosford
1911: John Lambton, 3rd Earl of Durham
1937: George Baillie-Hamilton, 12th Earl of Haddington
1953: Not used for male consorts
2023: TBA

Great Officers of State

Lord High Chancellors of Great Britain
1714: William Cowper, 1st Baron Cowper
1727: Peter King, 1st Baron King
1761: Robert Henley, 1st Baron Henley
1821: John Scott, 1st Baron Eldon
1831: Henry Peter Brougham, 1st Baron Brougham and Vaux
1838: Charles Christopher Pepys, 1st Baron Cottenham
1902: Hardinge Stanley Giffard, 1st Earl of Halsbury
1911: Robert Threshie Reid, 1st Baron Loreburn
1937: Douglas McGarel Hogg, 1st Viscount Hailsham
1953: Gavin Turnbull Simonds, 1st Baron Simonds

Lord Great Chamberlains of England, or their Deputies
1714: Robert Bertie, 1st Marquess of Lindsey
1727: Peregrine Bertie, 2nd Duke of Ancaster and Kesteven
1761: Peregrine Bertie, 3rd Duke of Ancaster and Kesteven
1821: Peter Drummond-Burrell, 2nd Baron Gwydyr
1831: George Horatio Cholmondeley, 2nd Marquess of Cholmondeley
1838: Peter Drummond-Willoughby, 22nd Baron Willoughby de Eresby
1902: George Henry Hugh Cholmondeley, 4th Marquess of Cholmondeley
1911: Charles Wynn-Carington, 1st Earl Carrington
1937: Gilbert Heathcote-Drummond-Willoughby, 2nd Earl of Ancaster
1953: George Horatio Charles Cholmondeley, 5th Marquess of Cholmondeley
2023: TBA

Lord High Constables of England
1714: John Montagu, 2nd Duke of Montagu
1727: Charles Lennox, 2nd Duke of Richmond
1761: John Russell, 4th Duke of Bedford
1821: Arthur Wellesley, 1st Duke of Wellington
1831: Arthur Wellesley, 1st Duke of Wellington
1838: Arthur Wellesley, 1st Duke of Wellington
1902: Alexander William George Duff, 1st Duke of Fife
1911: Alexander William George Duff, 1st Duke of Fife
1937: Robert Offley Ashburton Crewe-Milnes, 1st Marquess of Crewe
1953: Alan Francis Brooke, 1st Viscount Alanbrooke
2023: TBA

Earls Marshal of England, or their Deputies
1714: Henry Howard, 6th Earl of Suffolk
1727: Talbot Yelverton, 1st Earl of Sussex
1761: Thomas Howard, 2nd Earl of Effingham
1821: Kenneth Howard, 11th Baron Howard of Effingham
1831: Bernard Edward Howard, 12th Duke of Norfolk
1838: Bernard Edward Howard, 12th Duke of Norfolk
1902: Henry Fitzalan-Howard, 15th Duke of Norfolk
1911: Henry Fitzalan-Howard, 15th Duke of Norfolk
1937: Bernard Marmaduke Fitzalan-Howard, 16th Duke of Norfolk
1953: Bernard Marmaduke Fitzalan-Howard, 16th Duke of Norfolk
2023: TBA

Miscellaneous

Monarch's train
1685: Arthur Herbert and four eldest sons of earls.
1714: Viscount Walden, Viscount Mandeville, Viscount Rialton, Lord Ogilvy of Deskford and Thomas Coke
1727: Viscount Hermitage, Lord Brudenell, Viscount Cornbury, Earl of Euston, Augustus Schutz
1761: Viscount Mandeville, Marquess of Hartington, Lord Howard, Lord Grey, Viscount Beauchamp, Viscount Nuneham, Hon. James Brudenell
1821: Earl of Surrey, Marquess of Douro, Viscount Cranborne, Earl of Brecnock, Earl of Uxbridge, Earl of Rocksavage, Earl of Rawdon, Viscount Ingestre and Lord Francis Conyngham
1831: Marquess of Worcester, Earl of Euston, Earl of Kerry, Marquess of Titchfield, Marquess of Douro again and Sir George Seymour.
1838: Lady Adelaide Paget, Lady Frances Cowper, Lady Anne Wentworth-FitzWilliam, Lady Mary Grimston, Lady Caroline Gordon-Lennox, Lady Mary Talbot, Lady Wilhelmina Stanhope, Lady Louisa Jenkinson, Francis Conyngham, 2nd Marquess Conyngham
1902: Lionel Dawson-Damer, 6th Earl of Portarlington, Maurice FitzGerald, 6th Duke of Leinster, George Venables-Vernon, 8th Baron Vernon, Harold Festing, Victor Conyngham, 5th Marquess Conyngham, Eric Alexander, 5th Earl of Caledon, Arthur Somers-Cocks, 6th Baron Somers, Hon. Victor Spencer, Charles Harbord, 5th Baron Suffield
1911: David Ogilvy, 12th Earl of Airlie, William Romilly, 4th Baron Romilly, Anthony Lowther, Victor Harbord, Marquess of Hartington, Viscount Cranborne, Hon. Edward Knollys, Walter Campbell, Victor Spencer, 1st Viscount Churchill
1937: George Haig, 2nd Earl Haig, Alexander Ramsay, George Seymour, Robert Eliot, Henry Kitchener, 3rd Earl Kitchener, Viscount Lascelles, George Hardinge, Rognvald Herschell, 3rd Baron Herschell, George Jellicoe, 2nd Earl Jellicoe
1953: Lady Jane Vane-Tempest-Stewart, Lady Anne Coke, Lady Moyra Campbell, Lady Mary Baillie-Hamilton, Lady Jane Heathcote-Drummond-Willoughby, Lady Rosemary Spencer-Churchill, Mary Cavendish, Duchess of Devonshire
2023: TBA

Consort's train
1685: Mary Howard, Duchess of Norfolk and four earls' daughters.
1714: None (Sophia Dorothea of Celle had been divorced in 1694 and was under house confinement.)
1727: The Princess Royal, Princess Amelia, Princess Caroline, Lady Frances de Nassau d'Auverquerque, Lady Mary Capell, Lady Rebecca Herbert, Lady Anne Hastings
1761: Lady Mary Grey, Lady Elizabeth Montague, Lady Jane Stuart, Lady Selina Hastings, Lady Heneage Finch, Lady Mary Douglas, Princess Augusta
1821: None (Queen Caroline was not permitted to attend the coronation.)
1831: Duchess of Gordon, Lady Georgiana Bathurst, Lady Teresa Fox-Strangways, Lady Mary Pelham, Lady Theodosia Brabson, Lady Sophia Cust, Lady Georgiana Grey
1838: None
1902: Duchess of Buccleuch, J. N. Bigge, George Parker, 7th Earl of Macclesfield, Hon. Edward Lascelles, Hon. Robert Palmer, George Byng, 9th Viscount Torrington, Marquess of Stafford, Lord Claud Hamilton, Hon. Arthur Anson
1911: Duchess of Devonshire Lady Eileen Butler, Lady Eileen Knox, Lady Victoria Carrington, Lady Mabell Ogilvy, Lady Dorothy Browne, Lady Mary Dawson
1937: Duchess of Northumberland, Lady Ursula Manners, Lady Diana Legge, Lady Elizabeth Percy, Lady Iris Mountbatten
1953: None
2023: TBA

Bearers of the Pall of Gold
Carried by four Knights of the Garter:
1761: The Duke of Devonshire, The Earl of Northumberland, The Earl of Hertford and The Earl Waldegrave.
1821: The Duke of Beaufort, The Marquess Camden, The Earl of Winchilsea and The Marquess of Londonderry.
1831: The Duke of Leeds, The Duke of Dorset, The Marquess Camden again and The Marquess of Exeter.
1838: The Duke of Rutland, The Duke of Buccleuch, The Marquess of Anglesey and The Marquess of Exeter again.
1902: The Earl Cadogan, The Earl of Derby, The Earl of Rosebery and The Earl Spencer.
1911: The Earl Cadogan again, The Earl of Crewe, The Earl of Minto and The Earl of Rosebery again.
1937: The Duke of Abercorn, The Marquess of Londonderry, The Earl of Lytton and The Earl Stanhope.
1953: The Duke of Wellington, The Duke of Portland, The Earl Fortescue and The Viscount Allendale.
2023: TBA

Bearers of the Paten
1702: Gilbert Burnet, Bishop of Salisbury
1714: John Hough, Bishop of Lichfield and Coventry
1727: Not processed
1761: Zachary Pearce, Bishop of Rochester
1821: Bishop of Gloucester
1831: George Murray, Bishop of Rochester
1838: Christopher Bethell, Bishop of Bangor
1902: Lord Alwynee Compton, Bishop of Ely
1911: Arthur Winnington-Ingram, Bishop of London
1937: Arthur Winnington-Ingram, Bishop of London
1953: John W C Wand, Bishop of London
2023: TBA

Bearers of the Bible
1702: William Lloyd, Bishop of Worcester
1714: Gilbert Burnet, Bishop of Salisbury
1727: Edward Chandler, Bishop of Lichfield and Coventry
1761: Richard Osbaldeston, Bishop of Carlisle
1821: Bowyer Sparke, Bishop of Ely
1831: Henry Phillpotts, Bishop of Exeter
1838: Charles Sumner, Bishop of Winchester
1902: Arthur Winnington-Ingram, Bishop of London
1911: William Carpenter, Bishop of Ripon
1937: Bertram Pollock, Bishop of Norwich
1953: Percy Herbert, Bishop of Norwich
2023: TBA

Bearers of the Chalice
1702: Thomas Sprat, Bishop of Rochester
1714: John Evans, Bishop of Bangor
1727: Not processed
1761: Edmund Keene, Bishop of Chester
1821: George Henry Law, Bishop of Chester
1831: Richard Bagot, Bishop of Oxford
1838: John Kaye, Bishop of Lincoln
1902: Randall Davidson, Bishop of Winchester
1911: Edward Talbot, Bishop of Winchester
1937: Cyril Garbett, Bishop of Winchester
1953: Alwyn Williams, Bishop of Winchester
2023: TBA

Lords of the Manor of Worksop
1761: Charles Watson-Wentworth, 2nd Marquess of Rockingham (as Deputy to Edward Howard, 9th Duke of Norfolk)
1821: Bernard Howard, 12th Duke of Norfolk
1831: Bernard Howard, 12th Duke of Norfolk
1838: Bernard Howard, 12th Duke of Norfolk
1902: Henry Pelham-Clinton, 7th Duke of Newcastle-under-Lyne
1911: Henry Pelham-Clinton, 7th Duke of Newcastle-under-Lyne
1937: Henry Pelham-Clinton, Earl of Lincoln (as deputy to his father, Francis Pelham-Clinton-Hope, 8th Duke of Newcastle-under-Lyne)
1953: None
2023: TBA

Coronation banquet

Chief Larderer
1399: Edmund de la Chambre
1509: George Nevill, 5th Baron Bergavenny
1533: George Nevill, 5th Baron Bergavenny
1553: Henry Nevill, 6th Baron Bergavenny
1661: William Maynard, 2nd Baron Maynard
1685: George Nevill, 12th Baron Bergavenny
1689: William Maynard, 2nd Baron Maynard
1702: George Nevill, 13th Baron Bergavenny

References

Coronations of British monarchs
People
Coronations of the British monarch